Elections to Three Rivers Council in Hertfordshire, England, were held on 4 May 2000. One third of the council was up for election and the Liberal Democrat party stayed in overall control of the council.

After the election, the composition of the council was:
Liberal Democrat 26
Conservative 15
Labour 7

Election result

References
2000 Three Rivers election result

2000
2000 English local elections
2000s in Hertfordshire